The 2022 Watford Borough Council election took place on 5 May 2022. One third (12) of the 36 members of Watford Borough Council were elected. The elections took place alongside elections to local authorities across the United Kingdom, and an election for the Mayor of Watford.

The Liberal Democrats went into the election controlling the council, holding 24 of the 36 seats. They also held the mayorship, after Peter Taylor was elected in 2018.

Electoral process 

Watford Borough Council is elected in thirds, with a third of all seats up for election every year for three years, with an election to Hertfordshire County Council instead in the fourth year. The election took place by first-past-the-post voting, with wards represented by three councillors, with one elected in each election year to serve a four-year term. The seats up for election in 2022 are those last contested in the 2018 election.

Results summary

Candidates 
Candidates seeking re-election are marked with an asterisk (*).

Callowland

Central

Holywell

Leggatts

Meriden

Nascot

Oxhey

Park

Stanborough

Tudor

Vicarage

Woodside

Mayoral election 

The Conservative Party announced Binita Mehta-Parmar as their mayoral candidate in August 2021. Mehta-Parmar was formerly the Conservative group leader on Watford Borough Council. Incumbent mayor Peter Taylor was unanimously reselected by the Liberal Democrats as their candidate in September 2021. He stated that his priorities would be "to create more jobs, make the town greener and support those most in need." The Labour Party selected Asif Khan as their candidate in November 2021. Khan is a councillor on Watford Borough Council and Hertfordshire County Council. He stated that he would focus on development in Watford, and was opposed to the number of high-rise buildings under construction.

References

Watford
Watford Borough Council elections